Shark Jaws is a single-player arcade video game by Atari, Inc. under the name of Horror Games, originally released in 1975. An unlicensed tie-in to the movie Jaws, and believed to be the first commercially released movie tie-in, it was created to be a game about sharks eating people. Atari head Nolan Bushnell originally tried to license the Jaws name, but was unable to secure a license from Universal Pictures. Deciding to go ahead with the game anyway, it was retitled Shark JAWS, with the word Shark in tiny print and JAWS in large all caps print to create greater prominence. Bushnell created a second hidden subsidiary corporation, Horror Games—the previous being Kee Games—to help isolate Atari from a possible lawsuit. According to Bushnell, the game was successful enough to sell approximately two thousand units.

The player controls a deep-sea diver trying to catch small fish while avoiding a great white shark that is trying to eat him. Points are scored by running over the fish to catch them.

The unrelated 1972 electromechanical arcade game Killer Shark from Sega was briefly featured in the movie Jaws.

Technology
The game is housed in a custom cabinet that includes a single joystick and start button. The cabinet bezel uses blue and green colors, and portrays sharks swimming around along with a solitary swimmer. The game PCB is composed of discrete technology, and although the game was released under the name Horror Games, the PCB clearly states Atari.

References

Additional sources

External links
Restored arcade cabinet 
The Horror of IP Infringement, The Dot Eaters.com (2014)

Arcade video games
Arcade-only video games
Action video games
Jaws (franchise) video games
1975 video games
Atari arcade games
Video games developed in the United States
Video games with underwater settings